The Pontiac Building is a historic high-rise building located at 542 S. Dearborn St. in the Printer's Row neighborhood of Chicago, Illinois.

History 
Built in 1891, the building is the oldest surviving work in downtown Chicago designed by the architecture firm Holabird & Roche. The fourteen-story building represents the Chicago school of architecture and is designed as a steel frame covered in brick. The building's Dearborn Street facade features three tiers of bay windows, while the facade on Federal Street features one tier of bay windows flanked by two tiers of flat windows; while the outer two tiers on both facades each span two bays, the middle tier spans only one. The bottoms of these tiers of windows, located at the second floor of the building, feature terra cotta soffits; the building's cornice is also terra cotta. The first two floors of the building feature limestone piers with decorative capitals. Due to the building's architectural significance, it was added to the National Register of Historic Places on March 16, 1976.

References

Commercial buildings on the National Register of Historic Places in Chicago
Chicago school architecture in Illinois
Commercial buildings completed in 1891
Skyscraper office buildings in Chicago
Projects by Holabird & Root
1891 establishments in Illinois